Malla Jaqhi (Aymara malla lead, jaqhi precipice, cliff, "lead cliff", also spelled Malla Jakke) is a mountain in the Bolivian Andes which reaches a height of approximately . It is located in the La Paz Department, Aroma Province, Sica Sica Municipality. Malla Jaqhi lies southwest of Llallawa.

Malla Jaqhi is also the name of an intermittent stream which originates east of the mountain. Its waters flow to the southwest.

References 

Mountains of La Paz Department (Bolivia)